Achraf Douiri (born 27 November 1999) is a Dutch professional footballer who plays as a right-back for Eredivisie club FC Volendam.

Career
Douiri joined FC Volendam on 28 April 2021, signing a one-year deal. On 20 June 2022, he extended his contract with the club until 2024.

References

1999 births
Living people
Footballers from Amsterdam
Dutch footballers
Association football wingers
Association football fullbacks
Tweede Divisie players
Eerste Divisie players
SC Buitenveldert players
HFC EDO players
ADO Den Haag players
IFK Eskilstuna players
IJsselmeervogels players
FC Volendam players
Dutch expatriate footballers
Dutch expatriate sportspeople in Sweden
Expatriate footballers in Sweden